Ashes, Ashes is a science fiction novel written by René Barjavel, set in 2052 France. It was first published in 1943 by Denoël.  Its English-language translation by Damon Knight as Ashes, Ashes was published in 1967 by Doubleday.  Ravage has been included on many "all-time" best lists, including Annick Beguin's Les 100 principaux titres de la science-fiction.

Plot summary 
In the storyline, a civilization much more advanced than ours falls to its knees when electricity suddenly disappears. Chaos, disease, and famine ensue, which readers witness through the adventures of a small group of survivors led by François Deschamps. The group leaves Paris and starts a journey toward Provence where the survivors will create a new patriarchal society with Deschamps as their leader.

Critics 

This novel has been cited as influential in science-fiction literature in the following books:
 Annick Beguin, Les 100 principaux titres de la science-fiction, Cosmos 2000, 1981;
 Jacques Sadoul, Anthologie de la littérature de science-fiction, Ramsay, 1981;
 Science-fiction. La bibliothèque idéale, Albin Michel, 1988;
 Lorris Murail, Les Maîtres de la science-fiction, Bordas, coll. « Compacts », 1993;
 Stan Barets, Le science-fictionnaire, Denoël, coll. « Présence du futur », 1994;

References

External links 
 Summary of the novel (in French language)
 Review of the novel (in French language)

1943 French novels
1943 science fiction novels
French science fiction novels
Apocalyptic novels
French post-apocalyptic novels
Novels by René Barjavel
Novels set in France
Fiction set in 2052